Igor Vladimirovich Sorin (10 November 1969 in Moscow – 4 September 1998 in Moscow), was a Russian poet, musician and artist. He was part of the Russian boy band Ivanushki International, which he left in 1998, striving for a solo career. He died in September 1998 when he committed suicide by jumping out of his high-rise apartment building, dying three days later.

Biography
Born 10 November 1969 in Moscow, Igor Sorin studied at the Moscow school No. 841. As a child, he was selected for the role of Tom Sawyer, but before the start of filming Nikita Mikhalkov asked the film crew to take another boy, Fyodor Stukov. The film's director Stanislav Govorukhin granted that request. In desperation, Igor jumped from the second floor but survived.

With Warsaw Minskoff Theatre took part in musical "Metro" with performances in Europe and on Broadway, New York. From 1988 to 1994 had studied in Gnesin Music School.

From 1995 to March 1998 he was a soloist in the popular group Ivanushki International. Despite the widespread popularity of the group, Sorin decided to leave in 1998 after recording the album  Your letters. He was replaced by Oleg Yakovlev.

On the morning of 1 September 1998, Sorin jumped from the sixth-floor balcony of 12 Veresaev  Street. He died three days later.

Memory
In 1999, Ivanushki International released compilation Фрагменты жизни ("Fragmenti iz zhizni", "Fragments of Life"), which contained his best songs with Ivanushki, songs he had written prior to joining Ivanushki, his vocal poems, and a song dedicated to him, "Я тебя никогда не забуду" ("Ya tebya nikogda ne zabudu", "I Will Never Forget You").

References

External links
 

1969 births
1998 suicides
Suicides by jumping in Russia
Musicians from Moscow
Soviet male actors